The following is a list of fictional astronauts from recent times, using the Space Shuttle, the International Space Station and other spaceflight technologies, as depicted in works released between 2010 and 2029.

2010–2019

2020–2029

Notes

References

Lists of fictional astronauts